Parliamentary elections were held in British Somaliland on 17 February 1960. The result was a victory for the Somali National League (SNL), which won 20 of the 33 seats in the Legislative Council.

Background
Although a Legislative Council had been elected in 1959, a new constitution led to the Council having an elected majority; 33 elected seats and three government officials.

Electoral system
The 33 elected members of the Council were elected in single-member constituencies by first-past-the-post voting.

Results

References

British Somaliland
Elections in Somaliland
1960 in British Somaliland
Elections in Somalia
British Somaliland
Election and referendum articles with incomplete results